Ravensburg is the fourth studio album by Norwegian jazz musician Mathias Eick.

Background
Eick originally planned to name the album Family, but he soon realized that there are so many other albums with that title. Therefore, he opted instead for Ravensburg, the Swabian town in Germany from which his grandmother came.

Reception
Thomas Conrad of JazzTimes noted "Ravensburg, his fourth ECM album as a leader, reveals gradual, intelligent growth. His primary asset is still his trumpet sound, one of the purest, most radiant in jazz. His lyricism is still mysteriously provisional. No one plays trumpet lines like Eick’s. They are calls of hope and longing, streaks of light in the darkness. He still centers his albums, loosely, around unifying concepts. His previous recording, Midwest, was a journey toward home. Ravensburg is for those closest to him: family, friends, lovers."

Track listing

Band
Mathias Eick – trumpet, voice 
Håkon Aase – violin 
Andreas Ulvo – piano 
Audun Erlien – electric bass 
Torstein Lofthus – drums 
Helge Andreas Norbakken – drums, percussion

References

ECM Records albums
2018 albums
Albums produced by Manfred Eicher